Jóhannes Gunnarsson, SMM (3 August 1897—17 June 1972) was an Icelandic prelate of the Roman Catholic Church. He served as Apostolic Vicar of Iceland from 1942 until his resignation in 1967.

Biography
Jóhannes Gunnarsson was born in Reykjavík. His grandfather was a leader in the Althing, and his father converted to Roman Catholicism while attending school in Denmark; he was Iceland's only native Catholic for twenty years.

Jóhannes Gunnarsson did his early studies under the Icelandic Jesuits, then in Denmark, and later studied theology in the Netherlands. He was ordained as a priest of the Missionaries of the Company of Mary on 14 June 1924 and, upon his return to Reykjavík, commenced his priestly ministry at the Cathedral.

On 23 February 1943 Jóhannes was appointed Apostolic Vicar of Iceland and titular bishop of Hólar by Pope Pius XI. He received his episcopal consecration on the following 7 July at Saint Patrick Catholic Church in Washington, D.C. Jóhannes was enthroned as apostolic vicar after returning to Iceland, where he was the first native bishop in nearly four centuries; the last was Jón Arason, who was beheaded with his two sons by King Christian III in 1550. At the time of his consecration, there were only three parishes and four hundred Catholics in his country, which is predominantly of the Lutheran persuasion.

Jóhannes attended the Second Vatican Council from 1962 to 1965, and resigned his post in 1967, after twenty-five years of service. He later died at the age of 74.

References

External links
Hyperborean Bishop - TIME Magazine
Catholic-Hierarchy

1897 births
1972 deaths
Johannes Gunnarsson
20th-century Roman Catholic bishops in Iceland
Roman Catholic bishops of Reykjavík
Participants in the Second Vatican Council